Tundu Antiphas Mughwai Lissu (born 20 January 1968 in Ikungi district, Singida) is a Tanzanian lawyer, CHADEMA politician and Member of Parliament for Singida East constituency since 2010. He is also the former President of Tanganyika Law Society (TLS), the bar association of Tanzania mainland, and Chief Legal Officer for Tanzanian opposition party CHADEMA.

Biography

Early life 
Lissu was born in Mahambe village in Ikungi District  Tanzania. He attended Ilboru Secondary School in Arusha and graduated in 1983.

Career 

Lissu began his career in public interest advocacy. He worked with the Lawyers Environmental Action Team (LEAT) and the World Resources Institute as a lawyer and worked on various land rights issues with regards to protected areas and mining. Lissu entered politics in 2010 by winning the Member of Parliament seat for Singida East.

Over the years Lissu has built a reputation as a prominent lawyer, fierce opposition figure and outspoken government critic, especially with his repeated confrontations with the government in President Magufuli's tenure in the country. Lissu was responsible for the research and  preparation of the document that revealed the involvement of the state's high ranking officials in plundering of public funds, known as the 'List of Shame'. The politician was arrested at least six times in 2017 alone, accused of insulting the president and disturbing public order, among other charges. On 23 August 2017, his home was searched by the police after he was arrested and questioned over allegations of sedition and insulting President John Magufuli, calling him a 'petty dictator'. His arrest came  after he revealed to the public that a plane bought for the countries national carrier Air Tanzania had been impounded in Canada over unpaid government debts.

Assassination attempt and exile 

In the afternoon of September 7, 2017 during a parliamentary session break, Tundu Lissu, whilst in his car, was shot multiple times and seriously injured by unknown assailants in the parking lot of his parliamentary residence in Area D, Dodoma. This happened a few weeks after Lissu indicated publicly that certain people instructed by IGP Sirro  had been stalking him for weeks.

Tundu Lissu received emergency treatment for some hours at Dodoma General Hospital before, in fear of his safety, was air-lifted to Aga Khan Hospital in Nairobi, Kenya where he was hospitalized for months  before being flown to Belgium to undergo further treatment and rehabilitation. He was hospitalized at the Leuven University Hospital in Gasthuisberg, where he has reportedly undergone 19 operations by mid-March 2018.

Lissu's party officials openly addressed their concerns to the public and to President Magufuli, who is also Chairman of the nation's ruling party CCM, that the attempt on Lissu's life was politically motivated and just another retaliation on the lawmaker's repeated run-ins with the government. While President Magufuli condemned the attack, he was "shocked" and "saddened" by the shooting and was praying for Lissu's "quick recovery", several Tanzanian politicians have commented about the attack, with CHADEMA Chairman Freeman Mbowe and opposition figure Zitto Kabwe hinting on the necessity of having a foreign body man the investigation on the attack. No one was convicted for the attack on his life.

On 27 July 2020, Lissu returned to Tanzania after three years in exile to contest in the general elections.

In January 2023, Tundu Lissu announced that he had returned to Tanzania after five years of exile in Belgium.

Presidential aspirations 

Lissu returned to Tanzania from exile to be able to contest the Tanzanian general elections. He was chosen as CHADEMA's presidential candidate on 3 August 2020 and challenged Magufuli for president in the 2020 Tanzanian general election.

References

1968 births
Living people
Chadema MPs
Tanzanian MPs 2010–2015
Galanos Secondary School alumni
University of Dar es Salaam alumni
Alumni of the University of Warwick
People from Singida Region